Shake It Up: Live 2 Dance is the second soundtrack for the Disney Channel Original Series Shake It Up. It was released on March 20, 2012. The soundtrack lists songs featured on the show's second season (2011–2012).

Background
All of the songs were available for listening during the Radio Disney Planet Premiere held three days prior to the soundtrack's release and on RadioDisney.com, excluding The Deluxe Edition bonus tracks, and the Target exclusive tracks (with the exception of "The Star I R," which was played On-Air that day).  It sold 210,000 copies in the US in 2012, and was the best-selling TV soundtrack of the year.

Critical reception
Heather Phares of AllMusic gave a review: "The soundtrack to the Disney Channel's show Shake It Up, about two girls who finally get a chance to live their dreams of being professional dancers, is as foot-tapping as its subtitle, Live 2 Dance, suggests. The dance-pop set features Bella Thorne's text-speak hit "TTYLXOX," Blush's driving "Up Up and Away," and Amber Lily's Ke$ha-esque "Turn It On," along with tracks by Zendaya, Coco Jones, Adam Hicks and Adam Trent."

Singles
The first two single was "TTYLXOX", by Bella Thorne, and "Something to Dance For" by Zendaya released on March 6, 2012.

Track listing

Charts

Weekly charts

Year-end charts

References

Shake It Up (American TV series)
2012 soundtrack albums
Pop soundtracks
Television soundtracks
Walt Disney Records soundtracks